Leake Street is a street in the city of Fremantle, Western Australia, located between Market Street and Pakenham Street. It was named after George Leake, the first resident magistrate of Fremantle in 1839.

As a side street it was neglected early on for road surface improvement.

In the early twentieth century it was frequently cited as a problematic street with the members of the "Leake Street Push" being seen as disorderly and lawless.

Intersections

Notes

Streets in Fremantle